Hasna Doreh was an early 20th-century Somali female commander of the Dervish State, a state which frequently engaged in battles against the imperial powers during the Somaliland campaign. Female Darwiish such as her were referred to as Darwiishaad or Darawiishaad.

Biography
Doreh was the wife and commander of Mohammed Abdullah Hassan, whom assigned her one of the nine divisions of the Dervish army.

In his biography of Muhammad Abdullah Hassan and Hassan's Dervish comrades, the author Ray Beachey compared Doreh to the ancient British Queen Boadicea in her struggle against the Roman Empire.

Notes

References

African resistance to colonialism
African women in war
20th-century Somalian people
Somalian military leaders
Somalian women
Women in war 1900–1945
20th-century Somalian women